David Grenville John Sellwood (1925-2012) was a British aeronautical engineer and numismatist, specialising in Parthian coins. He was President of the Royal Numismatic Society.

Publications 
A full list of Sellwood's publications can be found in Ancient Iranian Numismatics. In Memory of David Sellwood.
 1971 An Introduction to the Coinage of Parthia (London). 1st edition.
 1980 An Introduction to the Coinage of Parthia (London). 2nd edition.

See also 
 List of presidents of the Royal Numismatic Society
 Royal Numismatic Society

References

External links
 Obituary of David Sellwood in the Journal of the Oriental Numismatic Society, 2012
 Royal Numismatic Society - past presidents

1925 births
2012 deaths
British numismatists
English aerospace engineers